Los Angeles Road Concerts is an arts collective that exhibits site-specific performances, installations, readings, lectures, and carpool happenings shown in the numerous sections of ignored or disused public space that make up the sidewalks in Los Angeles. Six events have taken place since 2008, along San Fernando Road, Washington Boulevard, Sunset Boulevard, Mulholland Drive, in Downtown Los Angeles and Culver City. Over 300 artists have shown work in the events, which invited artists to submit through a wide call for submissions process in which no one is rejected. Past participating artists included Marnie Weber, Julia Holter, Elliot Reed, Jay Lynn Gomez, Zackary Drucker, Kate Durbin, Christine Wang, Margaret Wappler, Fallen Fruit, Eric Lindley, Pau Pescador, Austin Young, Todd Gray, John Kilduff, West Hollywood city councilmember John D'Amico, Julie Tolentino, Marc Horowitz, Tangowerk, Sheree Rose, James Rojas, Margie Schnibbe and John Burtle. The collective was founded in 2008 by Stephen van Dyck.

See also 

Curatorial platform
Public art
Public space
Art intervention
Artist-run space
Alternative exhibition space
Happening
Interactive art
Street installations
Guerrilla theater
Guerrilla gardening
Creative Time

References

External links

Los Angeles Road Concerts website 

Art biennials
2008 in art
2017 in art
Public art in the United States
American artist groups and collectives
Performance art in Los Angeles
Artist-run centres
Artists from Los Angeles